Sai Tso Wan is an area near Kwun Tong in Kowloon, Hong Kong.

History
At the end of the 18th century, Hakka settled into the Cha Kwo Ling area, and quarrying became their main occupation. By that time, the villages of Cha Kwo Ling, Ngau Tau Kok, Sai Tso Wan and Lei Yue Mun were collectively called Sze Shan ("Four  Hills").

See also
 Four hills of Kowloon
 Sai Tso Wan Recreation Ground
 Laguna City
 Sceneway Garden

References

Kwun Tong District